Brier Hill is a national historic district located at Redstone Township, Fayette County, Pennsylvania.  The district includes 18 contributing buildings and 75 contributing structures in the coal mining community of Brier Hill. Most of the contributing buildings and structures were built between 1902, when the community was founded, and 1937, when the mine closed.  The district includes five frame double houses, the Power House, Hoist House, garage, and a number of unidentified buildings and structures.

It was added to the National Register of Historic Places in 1973.

References

External links

National Register of Historic Places in Fayette County, Pennsylvania
Historic districts in Fayette County, Pennsylvania
Historic districts on the National Register of Historic Places in Pennsylvania